Jordan Hunt (born 12 September 1997) is a New Zealand professional basketball player for the Hawke's Bay Hawks of the New Zealand National Basketball League (NZNBL). He debuted in the NZNBL in 2015 with the Wellington Saints and won a championship with them in 2016. After four years of college basketball in the United States with the Southern Oregon Raiders, he helped the Otago Nuggets win the NZNBL championship in 2020 while earning grand final MVP. He subsequently spent the 2020–21 NBL season in Australia with the Cairns Taipans as a development player.

Early life and career
Hunt was born in Wellington, New Zealand, and attended Hutt Valley High School in nearby Lower Hutt. In 2015, he debuted in the New Zealand NBL for the Wellington Saints, playing two games. In 2016, he played eight games for the Saints and was a member of their championship-winning team. He returned to the Saints for a one-game stint in 2018.

College career
As a freshman at Southern Oregon in 2016–17, Hunt averaged 10.4 points, 5.8 rebounds and 1.5 blocks per game. He scored a season-high 21 points against Oregon Tech on 31 January 2017.

As a sophomore in 2017–18, Hunt was named All-Cascade Conference honourable mention and earned Academic All-conference honors. He averaged 13.0 points, 6.6 rebounds and 1.4 blocks per game. He scored a season-high 20 points to go with 11 rebounds on 1 November 2017 against Maine-Fort Kent.

As a junior in 2018–19, Hunt was again named All-Cascade Conference honorable mention and Academic All-conference. He averaged 13.5 points, 7.0 rebounds and 1.6 blocks per game, and became the 23rd player in Southern Oregon Raiders' history to reach 1,000 career points. He scored a season-high 22 points on 30 December 2018 against Multnomah.

As a senior in 2019–20, Hunt averaged 12.9 points, 5.6 rebounds and 1.5 assists in 28 games.

Hunt finished his career at Southern Oregon with 1,147 points, ranking him 11th on the school's all-time scorers list. He also had 741 rebounds to finish eighth all time in school history.

Professional career
In June 2020, Hunt was acquired by the Otago Nuggets of the New Zealand NBL in a draft prior to the COVID-altered 2020 season. He helped the Nuggets reach the grand final, where they defeated the Manawatu Jets 79–77 to win the championship behind Hunt's team-high 21 points, which earned him grand final MVP. In 16 games, he averaged 19.6 points and 6.1 rebounds per game.

In December 2020, Hunt signed with the Cairns Taipans in Australia as a development player for the 2020–21 NBL season. He averaged 2.8 points in five games.

Following the Australian NBL season, Hunt joined the Hawke's Bay Hawks for the rest of the 2021 New Zealand NBL season. He helped the Hawks reach the grand final, where they lost 77–75 to the Wellington Saints. In 13 games, he averaged 11.2 points and 4.2 rebounds per game.

In December 2021, Hunt re-signed with the Hawks for the 2022 New Zealand NBL season. In 15 games, he averaged 15.5 points, 6.2 rebounds, 1.4 assists, 1.1 steals and 1.0 blocks per game.

In January 2023, Hunt re-signed with the Hawks for the 2023 New Zealand NBL season.

National team career
Hunt made his debut for the New Zealand national team in February 2021. He helped New Zealand win bronze at the 2022 FIBA Asia Cup.

Personal life
Hunt's father Brett played in the NZNBL, while his twin sister Madison also played basketball in high school.

References

External links
Hawke's Bay Hawks player profile
Southern Oregon Raiders college bio

1997 births
Living people
Cairns Taipans players
Centers (basketball)
Hawke's Bay Hawks players
New Zealand expatriate basketball people in Australia
New Zealand expatriate basketball people in the United States
New Zealand men's basketball players
Otago Nuggets players
Power forwards (basketball)
Southern Oregon Raiders men's basketball players
Sportspeople from Wellington City
Wellington Saints players